The 19th Virginia Cavalry Regiment was a cavalry regiment raised in Virginia for service in the Confederate States Army during the American Civil War.

History 
During the first two years of the war, two groups of semi-organized militia operated guerilla-style in what became West Virginia in 1863. Members of the 3rd Regiment Virginia State Line (a/k/a "Moccasin Rangers"), mainly from Calhoun County, but also with Joseph Kesslers Company D from Spencer, Roane County and the 2nd Regiment Virginia State Line would become the core of the 19th Virginia Cavalry. It received that name although in April 1863 when it was organized by General John Imboden as he made his way westward toward Beverly in Randolph County, fewer than 700 of the 3,365 men owned a horse. The Moccasin Rangers had often attacked civilian targets in western Virginia in 1861 and 1862, and were called "bushwhackers." General Imboden's brother George W. Imboden commanded a detachment from McClanahan's Battery attached to the 19th Cavalry.

Peregrine (Perry) Hays (1819–1905), a merchant and postmaster at Arnoldsburg in Calhoun County (who had represented Gilmer and Wirt Counties in the Virginia House of Delegates in 1855-6 and who had become the richest man in Calhoun County by 1860 and its sheriff in 1861), had organized the 3rd Regiment State Line in 1861, together with his partner (and the Calhoun County Clerk of Court) George Silcott (1830–1903). However both had returned to Arnoldsburg in disgust with some of its activities and so were listed as deserters by Dusky. Both would be captured and twice paroled by Union forces, as well as involved as negotiators in an incident at Spencer in Roane County which ultimately redounded to the disadvantage of Union Col. John C. Rathbone. One leader of the "outlaw faction", Perry Connolley or Conley (1837–1862) died in a skirmish at Welch Glade in Webster County in January 1862; his two brothers Cornelius and James fought for the Union. Another, George Downs (1820–1899) was captured early in 1862 and convicted of raiding the federal post office at Ripley, Jackson County in 1861, but in November 1862 was exchanged for Union prisoners held in Louisiana. Downs returned to action after promotion to Major, and fought until the war's end. Another leader of the Ripley Post Office raid, Daniel Duskey (1809–?) was captured in Wirt County with 33 of his men on December 15, 1861 and sent to prison in Albany, New York after his conviction for that robbery. President Lincoln pardoned him on June 13, 1863, and he was captured again in Webster County on February 9, 1864. He escaped from the prison at Wheeling on July 18, 1865.

It fought with Jenkin's and W.L. Jackson's Brigade and confronted the Federals in western Virginia. As western Virginia voters overwhelmingly voted for independence the second time and created the state of West Virginia by passing a state constitution with anti-slavery provisions, the Moccasin Rangers formally organized in April, 1863 as Company A of the 19th Virginia Cavalry. It fought with the Army of Northern Virginia, in southwest Virginia, and in the Shenandoah Valley. The unit disbanded during April, 1865.
Its commanders were Colonel William Lowther Jackson, Lieutenant Colonel William P. Thompson, and Majors George Downs and Joseph K. Kesler.

Companies and officers

See also

List of Virginia Civil War units
List of West Virginia Civil War Confederate units

References

Units and formations of the Confederate States Army from Virginia
1863 establishments in Virginia
Military units and formations established in 1863
1865 disestablishments in Virginia
Military units and formations disestablished in 1865